Larger than Life is the fifth studio album from Australian vocal group The Ten Tenors, released in July 2004.

Track listing

 Bonus DVD
 "Sundance"	
 "Opera Medley"  "La Donna E Mobile" (Rigoletto), "Che Gelida Manina" (La Boheme), "Va Pensiero" (Nabucco). "Largo al Factotum" (The Barber of Seville)	
 "Dancing Queen"
 "World Anthem"

Charts

References

2004 albums
The Ten Tenors albums
Warner Records albums